Framvegis Uttan Vit is an album released by the Faroese band MC-Hár in 1998. The band was the first Faroese rap-band, established in 1991. The band is still active, they have performed at the two most important music festivals in the Faroes: Summerfestival and the G! Festival.

Track listing

 Jomfrú rapp 
 Tú ert deyðir!
 Andalig samvera
 Fostursangs land
 Kom við mær
 Sangurin um orð, tøl og tos
 Læran um familjuvirði og fólkasið
 Kynsligt flopp
 Tað, ið eg havi, sum tú ikki hevur
 Savnist nú!
 Inn trúgv
 Endiliga tað ordentliga ólavsøku-rappið
 Óforstaðið
 Vátt
 Q.Z.A.: kókað terpentin?
 Fjøldin hevndi seg
 Umsúkling

References 

1998 albums
MC-Hár albums